Hipa Te Maihāroa (?–1886) was a notable New Zealand tribal leader, tohunga and prophet. Of Māori descent, he identified with the Waitaha, Kāti Māmoe and Ngāi Tahu iwi. He was born at Te Waiateruati pā near Temuka, South Canterbury, New Zealand.

References

1886 deaths
New Zealand Māori religious leaders
Tohunga
Ngāi Tahu people
Year of birth missing
People from South Canterbury
Kāti Māmoe people
Waitaha (South Island iwi)